Knock on Any Door is a British television anthology series which aired for two series in 1965-1966 (nine episodes in first series, eleven episodes in second series). The series was produced by Associated Television (ATV) and aired on ITV. All episodes of the series are intact.

References

External links
Knock on Any Door on IMDb

1965 British television series debuts
1966 British television series endings
1960s British drama television series
English-language television shows
Black-and-white British television shows
ITV television dramas
1960s British anthology television series